Nikolai Nikolayevich Savichev (born 13 February 1965) is a Russian football coach and a former player. He is an assistant manager of Russian Premier League side FC Torpedo Moscow. He is the identical twin brother of Yuri Savichev and a father of Daniil Savichev.

Honours
 Soviet Top League bronze: 1988, 1991.
 Soviet Cup winner: 1986.
 Russian Cup winner: 1993.
 Top 33 players year-end list: 1988, 1990.

International career
Savichev made his debut for USSR on November 21, 1988 in a friendly against Syria.

References

External links
 Profile
 Profile

1965 births
Living people
Footballers from Moscow
Soviet footballers
Association football midfielders
Soviet Union international footballers
Russian footballers
FC Torpedo Moscow players
FC Torpedo-2 players
Russian Premier League players
Russian football managers
Russian twins
Twin sportspeople
FC Torpedo Moscow managers
Soviet Top League players
Russian Premier League managers
FC FShM Torpedo Moscow players